Serengeti International Hospital, also Serengeti Hospital, is a public community hospital, under construction, in Serengeti District, Mara Region, in Tanzania. The hospital is intended to serve the needs of both the local population and the tourists visiting the nearby Serengeti National Park.

Location
The hospital is located in northeastern Tanzania, in Serengeti District, Mara Region, adjacent to Serengeti National Park.

Overview
The hospital is being built in phases. The first phase, planned to cost US$1.5 million, consists the outpatient department, and is expected to be complete by December 2017, with anticipated opening in January 2018.

The hospital is expected to cater to the Tanzanian citizens resident in 78 villages within Serengeti District and to the almost 400,000 tourists who visit the adjacent Serengeti National Park every year. The construction is funded by the government of Tanzania with contribution from the Tanzania National Parks.

See also
 List of hospitals in Tanzania

References

External links
 Website of Tanzania National Parks

Hospitals in Tanzania
Buildings and structures in Tanzania
Mara Region